Ceresia pulchripes, the common ceresia, is a species of bush cricket or katydid endemic to South Africa. It is the only species in the genus Ceresia.

References

IUCN Red List least concern species
Tettigoniinae
Endemic insects of South Africa
Orthoptera of Africa
Insects described in 1916
Monotypic Orthoptera genera